Kauaiina is a genus of moths in the family Geometridae erected by Jules C. E. Riotte in 1978.

Species
Kauaiina alakaii Riotte, 1979
Kauaiina howarthi Riotte, 1990
Kauaiina ioxantha (Meyrick, 1899)
Kauaiina molokaiensis Riotte, 1979
Kauaiina montgomeryi Riotte, 1978
Kauaiina parva Riotte, 1980
Kauaiina rubropulverula Riotte, 1989

References

Larentiinae
Endemic moths of Hawaii
Moth genera